Yuen Tun Tsuen or Yuen Tun Village is a village in Tsing Lung Tau, Tsuen Wan District, Hong Kong.

History
Interviews conducted in 1982 mentioned that "When Tsing Yi villagers wanted to marry, they looked for partners from Tin Fu Tsai, Tsuen Wan and Yuen Tun."

References

External links

 Delineation of area of existing village Yuen Tun (Tsuen Wan) for election of resident representative (2019 to 2022)
 Antiquities Advisory Board. Historic Building Appraisal. Chung Old House, Yuen Tun Pictures:  
 Antiquities Advisory Board. Historic Building Appraisal. Former Chung Ancestral Hall (1), Yuen Tun Tsuen Pictures
 Antiquities Advisory Board. Historic Building Appraisal. Former Chung Ancestral Hall (2), Yuen Tun Tsuen Pictures

Villages in Tsuen Wan District, Hong Kong